Cauã Reymond Marques (born 20 May 1980) is a Brazilian actor. He is best known for his television roles in Malhação and Cordel Encantado. His television credits include Belíssima, Passione, A Favorita, and Avenida Brasil.

Biography 
Reymond was born in Rio de Janeiro. He is of Swiss, Portuguese and Native Brazilian descent.

Personal life 
In 2007, he married actress Grazi Massafera. They have a daughter named Sofia.

In 2013, Reymond and Massafera separated.

He has been training martial arts since he was 12 years old and holds a 5th dan black belt in Brazilian Jiu-Jitsu, in addition to being a two-time Brazilian Jiu-Jitsu champion before focusing on his acting career.

Filmography

Awards

References

External links 

 
 

1980 births
Living people
Male actors from Rio de Janeiro (city)
Brazilian people of Swiss descent
Brazilian people of Portuguese descent
Brazilian people of indigenous peoples descent
Brazilian male telenovela actors
Brazilian male film actors
Brazilian male television actors
Brazilian practitioners of Brazilian jiu-jitsu